Anthony Woodville, 2nd Earl Rivers  (c. 144025 June 1483), was an English nobleman, courtier, bibliophile and writer. He was the brother of Queen Elizabeth Woodville who married King Edward IV. He was one of the leading members of the Woodville family, which came to prominence during the reign of King Edward IV. After Edward's death, he was arrested and then executed by the Duke of Gloucester (the future King Richard III) as part of a power struggle between Richard and the Woodvilles. His English translation of The Dictes and Sayings of the Philosophers is one of the first books printed in England.

Origins 
He was the eldest son to survive childhood of Richard Woodville, 1st Earl Rivers, by his wife Jacquetta of Luxembourg. His sister was Elizabeth Woodville, who married King Edward IV and became queen.

Career 
Like his father, he was originally a Lancastrian, fighting on that side at the Battle of Towton, but later became a Yorkist. The Woodvilles became very influential at the royal court after his sister Elizabeth Woodville married Edward IV and became queen. Anthony was made a Knight of the Garter. He is known to have been a great tournament champion, and once fought a two-day "duel" with Antoine, bastard of Burgundy.

The Yorkists, fighting for Edward IV, were defeated at the Battle of Edgecote Moor, on 26 July 1469, and Richard Woodville and his second son John Woodville were taken prisoners at Chepstow. After a hasty and controversial trial, they were both beheaded at Kenilworth on 12 August 1469 and Anthony succeeded his father in the earldom.

Career as Earl Rivers 
He joined the king in his temporary exile in 1470, and returned with him the next year, where he was wounded at the Battle of Barnet. As a result of this battle, Edward IV regained the throne. Whilst in charge of the garrison at the Tower of London, Rivers defeated an attempt by a Lancastrian army (led by Thomas Neville) to capture the city during the Siege of London (1471).

In 1472, Edward IV sent Rivers and his younger brother Edward Woodville to Brittany at the head of 1,000 archers to help the Bretons fend off a threatened French invasion of the duchy. The French withdrew when faced with determined resistance.

In 1473, King Edward IV appointed Rivers Governor of the Prince of Wales' household and Rivers went with the prince to Ludlow Castle. He was also appointed High Sheriff of Caernarvonshire for life. His duties included the administration of justice throughout the principality.

Death and succession 
When the king died suddenly in 1483, Rivers was ordered by his sister to bring the Prince of Wales, now King Edward V, straight back to London under an armed guard. They were intercepted by Richard, Duke of Gloucester (later King Richard III), who arrested the Earl, along with his nephew Sir Richard Grey, the young king's half-brother. Rivers was imprisoned and then beheaded at Pontefract Castle on 25 June 1483 as part of the duke's path towards kingship (as Richard III).

Anthony was succeeded by his brother Richard Woodville, 3rd Earl Rivers. The Scales lands inherited from his wife were bequeathed to his younger brother Edward Woodville, but King Richard III ignored Anthony's wishes as Edward had joined Henry Tudor.

Marriages 
He married twice, without legitimate progeny, as follows:
Firstly to Elizabeth de Scales, suo jure Baroness Scales (d. 1473), daughter and heiress of Thomas de Scales, 7th Baron Scales, and widow of Henry Bourchier, younger son of Henry Bourchier, 1st Earl of Essex. Before succeeding to his father's earldom, Anthony was summoned to Parliament, in right of his wife, as Baron Scales.
Secondly he married Mary FitzLewis, daughter of Henry FitzLewis.

Mistresses and illegitimate progeny 

By his mistress Gwenlina Stradling, a daughter of William Stradling<ref>Maclean, Sir John & Heane, W.C., (Eds.), The Visitation of the County of Gloucester Taken in the Year 1623 by Henry Chitty and John Phillipot as Deputies to William Camden Clarenceux King of Arms, etc, London, 1885, p.133</ref> of St Donat's Castle in Glamorgan, Wales, he had one illegitimate daughter named Margaret, who married Sir Robert Poyntz (d. 1520) lord of the manor of Iron Acton in Gloucestershire, who built the Poyntz Chapel within the Gaunt's Chapel in Bristol. The stone ceiling boss of the Poyntz Chapel displays in relief sculpture the arms of Poyntz (of 4 quarters) impaling the arms of Woodville (of 6 quarters, 3rd quarter Woodville), and the two wooden end-panels of his monumental coffin, decorated with the heraldry of Poyntz and Woodville, survive in the Gaunt's Chapel in which he was buried. The Heraldic Visitation of Gloucestershire records that:"A testimony of this match apereth by indenture of covenant of the mariag yett extant under the hand and seale of the said Erle, by letters written by the hand of the reverend ffather Morton, Cardinall, also by the armes of the Erle impaled w(i)th Poyntz on the top of a Chappell near Bristowe where they lye buried".

 Literary interests 
Rivers had met the earliest English printer William Caxton when in exile in Bruges, and there in 1475–76 Caxton published Cordyale, or Four last thinges, Rivers' English translation from the French of Jean Miélot of Les quattres choses derrenieres, itself a translation of the Cordiale quattuor novissimorum. After both of them had returned to England, one of the first, if not the first, books printed in England was Rivers' translation from French of the Dictes and Sayings of the Philosophers, printed by Caxton at Westminster in 1477. Lambeth Palace Library has a manuscript illustration showing Rivers presenting a copy of this book to Edward IV (illustrated top right).

 Notes 

 References 

 Ives, E. W. "Andrew Dymmock and the Papers of Anthony Earl Rivers," Bulletin of the Institute of Historical Research 41 (1968): 216–229.
 Lowe, D. E. "Patronage and Politics: Edward IV, the Wydevills, and the Council of the Prince of Wales, 1471-83," The Bulletin of the Board of Celtic Studies 29 (1981): 545–573.
Pidgeon, Lynda. "Antony Wydevile, Lord Scales and Earl Rivers:  Family, Friends and Affinity. Part 1," The Ricardian 15 (2005): 1–19.  Richard III Society.
Pidgeon, Lynda. "Antony Wydevile, Lord Scales and Earl Rivers: Family, Friends and Affinity. Part 2," The Ricardian 15 (2006): 1–14.  Richard III Society.
Scofield, Cora L. "The Capture of Lord Rivers and Sir Anthony Woodville, 19 January 1460," The English Historical Review'' 37:146 (April 1922): 253–255.

1440s births
1483 deaths
Anthony
Knights of the Garter
Earls Rivers
Scales, Anthony Woodville, 8th Baron
French–English translators
High Sheriffs of Caernarvonshire
People executed under the Yorkists
Executed English people
People executed under the Plantagenets by decapitation
Barons Scales